Ogan Ilir Regency (abbreviation OI) is a regency of South Sumatra Province, Indonesia. It takes its name from the main river which stream that area, Ogan River. And the name Ilir means downstream. Indralaya is the regency seat. The regency borders Palembang, and Muara Enim Regency to the north, Ogan Komering Ilir Regency to the east, Ogan Komering Ilir Regency, and East Ogan Komering Ulu Regency to the south, and Muara Enim Regency to the west.

Ogan Ilir Regency covers an area of 2,666.07 km², and had a population of 380,904 at the 2010 Census and 416,549 at the 2020 Census.

Administrative districts 
Based on Presidential Decree No.37/2003, Ogan Komering Ilir Regency was divided into two regencies, namely Ogan Komering Ilir Regency and Ogan Ilir Regency. Ogan Ilir Regency then included the six districts of Indralaya (as the capital), Tanjung Raja, Tanjung Batu, Muara Kuang, Pemulutan and Rantau Alai. This Regency is now administratively composed of sixteen districts (kecamatan), comprising 241 villages (14 urban kelurahan and 227 rural desa). Their areas (in km2) and their populations at the 2010 Census and the 2020 Census are listed below. The table also includes the locations of the district administrative centres, the number of administrative villages (rural desa and urban kelurahan) in each district, and its postal codes.

Notes: (a) Six of the district administrative centres (indicated by asterisks (") in the column) have the status of kelurahan, while the others are desa. (b) except for four villages - Sakatiga Seberang (with post code of 30814), Tanjung Sejaro (with post code of 30815), Sakatiga (with post code of 30816) and Tanjung Seteko (with post code of 30817). (c) except for two villages - Payakabung (with post code of 30812) and Tanjung Pering (with post code of 30813).

References

Regencies of South Sumatra